David Howard (born October 19, 1946) is an American politician and a Republican member of the Montana Senate, representing District 29 since 2015. Previously, he served in the Montana House of Representatives and represented District 60, which represents the Stillwater County and part of the Sweet Grass County area, from 2009 to 2015.

References

1946 births
Living people
Republican Party members of the Montana House of Representatives
People from Stillwater County, Montana
Place of birth missing (living people)
21st-century American politicians